Mahila Samiti English High School is a school in Thakurli-Maharashtra, India, PIN 421201. It was built during the pre-independence period by the British government. It was established in 1956 by the wives of officers of the Electrical Department of Central Railway for children of underprivileged staff members.

Administrative body 

To regulate and monitor the smooth functioning of the school an administration body was formed and registered under the charity commissioner's office, Thane. Since all the members (wives of railway officers and staff) were women, the body came to be known as "Mahila Samiti" (women's committee) and they gave the same name to "Mahila Samiti" School.

References

High schools and secondary schools in Maharashtra
Education in Kalyan-Dombivli
Educational institutions established in 1956
1956 establishments in Bombay State
Mahila Samiti English High School is very Good School,All teacher And Sir are very understanding and 
supportive, And friendly.
Mahila Samiti English High School is very Good School,All teacher And Sir are very understanding and supportive, And friendly.